Charles Priestley may refer to:

 Charlie Priestley (1916–1992), Australian rules footballer
 Charles Priestley (meteorologist) (1915–1998), British meteorologist